Carol Harwood is a former England women's international footballer. Her greatest achievement was playing in the winning games of the 1998 FA Women's Cup Final and 1999 FA Women's Cup Final with Arsenal.

Honours
Arsenal
 FA Women's Cup: 1998, 1999

References

Living people
London Bees players
Arsenal W.F.C. players
English women's footballers
FA Women's National League players
England women's international footballers
Women's association football defenders
Year of birth missing (living people)